Pecorini is an Italian surname. Notable people with the surname include:

 Margaret Bucknell Pecorini (1879–1963), Italian painter
 Nicola Pecorini (born 1957), Italian cinematographer
 Simone Pecorini (born 1993), Italian footballer

Italian-language surnames